Eurydema oleracea is a species of shield bug in the family Pentatomidae and is commonly known as the rape bug, the crucifer shield bug, the cabbage bug or the brassica bug.

Morphology and biology
The species has a dark ground colour which is overlain with red, yellow, cream, white or orange markings. There is an oval spot on the top of the mesonotum and one on each of the elytra as well as a longitudinal stripe on the prothorax. In young adults these spots are yellow but change to white or red in older bugs. The colour of the abdomen changes at the same time from buff to black. Such age-specific changes in the imago coloration, are connected with sexual maturation of the bugs and often take place in diapausing imagos at the time they are becoming active again.

The eggs are cylindrical, buff-colored with a dark pattern. They are laid on the stems and inflorescences of host plants in batches usually of about twelve eggs in two neat rows. Each female lays sixty to eighty eggs over a period of four to six weeks. The nymph is pale gray with a dark-brown pronotum and spots on the dorsal side of the abdomen. It moults five times, and the adults and nymphs live quite openly on plants. Adults overwinter, hibernating in leaf debris at the edge of woods or in bushes.

Distribution
This species has a wide distribution in the eastern Palearctic realm. It is found in Western Europe except for northern Scandinavia, Kazakhstan, most of Russia, the mountainous regions of west and central Asia, and in North Africa.

Ecology
These species overwinters as an adult, emerging in late spring. There is one generation in the northern part of their range and two in the south. The adults and nymphs are consumers of a wide range of cruciferous plants (Brassicaceae), feeding mainly on the flowering parts. Among cultivated crops the bugs damage cabbage, radish, turnip, rutabaga, horseradish and rape. They can also develop on many species of wild cruciferous plants. Natural enemies include a number of species of parasitoid wasps in the family Scelionidae, some species of predatory bugs in the family Nabidae, a rare parasitic fly Clytiomya continua, some spiders and ants. They can be controlled by crop rotation, the destruction of cruciferous weeds and the use of insecticides.

Gallery

See also
List of shield bug species of Great Britain

References

External links
Insects of Europe

Strachiini
Agricultural pest insects
Bugs described in 1758
Articles containing video clips
Hemiptera of Europe
Taxa named by Carl Linnaeus